Carl Jakob Gustaf Lindström (born 14 June 1993) is a Swedish football midfielder.

Career
Progressing through the Ahlafors IF youth department, he joined Örgryte IS' youth setup at the age of 14. After breaking through in the first team, he transferred to fellow Gothenburg team BK Häcken ahead of the 2017 Allsvenskan season. He played 4 Allsvenskan games. He returned to Örgryte on a two-year contract, and after two seasons he went on to Norwegian third-tier club Fredrikstad FK.

References

1993 births
Living people
People from Ale Municipality
Swedish footballers
Örgryte IS players
BK Häcken players
Fredrikstad FK players
Association football midfielders
Swedish expatriate footballers
Expatriate footballers in Norway
Swedish expatriate sportspeople in Norway
Allsvenskan players
Superettan players
Norwegian Second Division players
Sportspeople from Västra Götaland County